Haloacid dehalogenase-like hydrolase domain-containing protein 1A is an enzyme that in humans is encoded by the HDHD1A gene. It encodes a pseudouridine-5'-phosphatase but can also accommodate other phopshorylated metabolites with a lower affinity.

References

Further reading